Robert Markus may refer to:

 Robert Markuš (born 1983), Serbian chess player
 Robert Austin Markus (1924–2010), British historian